Erika Check Hayden is an American science journalist and the director of the Science Communication Program (SciCom), a graduate program at the University of California, Santa Cruz, since January 2017. She is based in San Francisco, California.

Biography
Check Hayden received her bachelor's degree in biology from Stanford University, where she wrote for both the Stanford Daily and for the Stanford Alumni magazine.

Check Hayden previously wrote for the news section of the peer-reviewed journal Nature from 2001 to 2016. She initially worked for Nature out of Washington, D.C. until 2006, when she began working for them out of San Francisco, California. She first became an instructor for the SciCom program in 2010. She covered the 2014 ebola outbreak in West Africa for Nature and Wired, with funding from a fellowship from the Pulitzer Center for Crisis Reporting. Her coverage focused on aspects of the ebola outbreak that had generally been ignored by the mainstream media, such as the outbreak's effects on maternal health. She was later recognized with three awards from the Association of Health Care Journalists for this reporting.

References

External links

American science journalists
Living people
American women journalists
Writers from San Francisco
Stanford University alumni
University of California, Santa Cruz faculty
Women science writers
Wired (magazine) people
21st-century American journalists
Year of birth missing (living people)
21st-century American women